Goodwood Racecourse is a horse-racing track five miles north of Chichester, West Sussex, in England controlled by the family of the Duke of Richmond, whose seat is nearby Goodwood House. It hosts the annual Glorious Goodwood meeting in late July and early August, which is one of the highlights of the British flat racing calendar, and is home to three of the UK's 36 annual Group 1 flat races, the Sussex Stakes, the Goodwood Cup and the Nassau Stakes. Although the race meeting has become known as 'Glorious Goodwood', it is sponsored by Qatar and officially called the 'Qatar Goodwood Festival'.

It is considered to enjoy an attractive setting to the north of Trundle Iron Age hill fort, which is used as an informal grandstand with views of the whole course. One problem is that its proximity to the coast means that it can get foggy.

This is an unusual, complex racecourse with a straight six furlongs—the "Stewards' Cup Course"—which is uphill for the first furlong and mostly downhill thereafter. There is a tight right-handed loop at the far end of the straight on which there are starts for various longer distance courses. These include the 1 mile 2 furlongs (1m 2f) "Craven Course", the 1m 4f "Gratwicke Course" and the 1m 6f "Bentinck Course". The start for the 2m 5f "Cup Course" is quite close to the winning post—horses travel outwards on the straight, around the loop and back. Throughout the loop there are severe undulations and sharp turns. The course is used for flat racing only.

From 1968 to 1970 the course's late summer meeting was shown on ITV, and from the early 2000s some races from the course occasionally appeared on Channel 4, but otherwise the course had been covered exclusively by the BBC for 50 years from 1956 (when it first appeared on television) to 2006. In 2007 the rights passed to Channel 4 Racing. Since 2017 races have been live on ITV Racing after the channel won the rights to televise horse racing from Channel 4.

In the late 18th century, Goodwood became the location for the first flag start on a British racecourse, at the behest of Lord George Bentinck, after a particularly shambolic start involving jockey Sam Arnull caused by an elderly deaf starter with a speech impediment. Its primary meeting, now known as "Glorious Goodwood", was established in 1802 and the important early handicap the Goodwood Stakes was established in 1823.

Notable races 

Other races
 Conqueror Stakes
 Festival Stakes
 On The House Stakes
 Starlit Stakes
 Tapster Stakes

References

External links 
 

 
Goodwood estate
Sports venues in West Sussex
Horse racing venues in England